Boholia is a monotypic genus of flowering plants in the family Rubiaceae. It was described by Elmer Drew Merrill in 1926. The genus contains only one species, viz. Boholia nematostylis, which is native to Sumatra and the Lesser Sunda Islands of Indonesia and the Philippines.

References

External links 
 Boholia in the World Checklist of Rubiaceae

Monotypic Rubiaceae genera
Airospermeae